Durg Vijay Singh is an Indian professor at Central University of South Bihar Gaya. Prior to joining, Singh worked as lecturer in Chhatrapati Shahu Ji Maharaj University, Kanpur (Oct 2011–12). Singh has graduated from Lucknow University in Biological science and post graduated in Biochemistry from G. B. Pant University of Agriculture and Technology, Pantnagar. He did M.Tech and Ph.D in Bioinformatics from IIIT, Allahabad under the mentorship of Prof. Krishna Misra, IIIT Allahabad in the area of molecular modeling and drug design. He was the recipient of MHRD-Gate, CSIR fellowship and project fellowship during his academic career. He was the part of many national and International conferences. He has published his research in peer reviewed journal like: Indian Journal Weed Science, Bioinformation, Journal of Organic and medicinal chemistry letters.

References

Living people
People from Ambedkar Nagar district
University of Lucknow alumni
Academic staff of the Central University of South Bihar
Year of birth missing (living people)
Academic staff of Chhatrapati Shahu Ji Maharaj University